Ken Read (born 1955) is a Canadian alpine skier

Ken or Kenneth Read may also refer to:
Ken Read (sailor) (born 1961), American yachtsman 
Ken Read (footballer) (1911–1999), Australian rules footballer

See also
Ken Reid (disambiguation)
Ken Reed (disambiguation)